The Alliance of Primorje-Gorski Kotar ( or PGS) is a minor Croatian liberal regionalist political party of Primorje-Gorski Kotar County.

They formerly had one representative in the Croatian Parliament in an alliance with the Croatian People's Party.

The party originated from the city of Rijeka under the name of Rijeka Democratic Alliance. After winning a seat in 1992 elections, the party expanded its activities to the rest of Primorje-Gorski Kotar County and changed the name accordingly.

Before the 2007 elections, PGS has announced coalition (joint electoral ticket) with Croatian Peasant Party and Croatian Social Liberal Party.

Electoral history

Legislative

European Parliament

References

External links
  

Political parties established in 1990
Regionalist parties in Croatia